Founded in 1892, The Bibliographical Society is the senior learned society dealing with the study of the book and its history in the United Kingdom.

Largely owing to the efforts of Walter Arthur Copinger, who was supported by Richard Copley Christie, the Bibliographical Society was founded in London in 1892; Copinger was the Society's first president, and held the post for four years. His own work in the field, however, lacked accuracy.

The Society holds a monthly lecture between October and May, usually on the third Tuesday of the month at the Society of Antiquaries of London.

The first fifty years of the Bibliographical Society were documented in the book The Bibliographical Society, 1892–1942: Studies in Retrospect. The Book Encompassed, a volume of essays marking the Society's centenary was published in 1992.

Objectives
The objectives of the Society are:

 to promote and encourage study and research in the fields of:
   historical, analytical, descriptive and textual bibliography
   the history of printing, publishing, bookselling, bookbinding and collecting
 to hold meetings at which papers are read and discussed
 to print and publish a journal (The Library) and books concerned with bibliography
 to maintain a bibliographical library
 from time to time to award a medal for services to bibliography
 to support bibliographical research by awarding grants and bursaries

Library and archives
The Society's library was housed at Stationers' Hall in the City of London but moved to Senate House in January 2007.  In 2017 it moved again to the Albert Sloman Library at the University of Essex.

The Society's archive is housed at the Bodleian Library and may be used by scholars and members of the Society.

Publications
The Society has published a journal since 1893, originally entitled Transactions of the Bibliographical Society. In 1920 it took over publication of The Library (issued since 1889) and adopted that as the main title of the Transactions. (The Library was founded in 1889 by John Young Walker MacAlister.) The different series of the Transactions and The Library are:

Transactions of the Bibliographical Society, vol. 1–15 (1893–1919)
The Library, vol. 1–10 (1889–1898)
The Library, Second/New series, vol. 1–10 (1900–1910)
The Library, Third series, vol. 1–10 (1910–1919)
The Library, Fourth series, vol. 1–26 (1920–1946)
The Library, Fifth series, vol. 1–33 (1946–1978)
The Library, Sixth series, vol. 1–21 (1979–1999)
The Library, Seventh series, vol. 1– (2000– )

The Library is a quarterly journal and is issued free to members who also receive a copy of all books published by the Society.

In 1937, Harry Carter, Ellic Howe, Alfred F. Johnson, Stanley Morison and Graham Pollard started to produce a list of all known pre-1800 type specimens. The list was published in The Library in 1942. However, because of the war, many libraries at the European continent were not accessible anymore.

Gold medal
The Society occasionally awards a gold medal for "distinguished services to bibliography to individuals who have made an outstanding contribution to the development of the subject and the furtherance of the Society's aims."

See also
 Bibliographical Society of America
 Sir Frank Francis and Julian Roberts, former joint secretaries of the Society
 Society for the History of Authorship, Reading and Publishing
 Books in the United Kingdom

References

External links
 Bibliographical Society official website
  (HathiTrust)

Organizations established in 1892
Clubs and societies in London
Learned societies of the United Kingdom
Bibliography
History of books
University of London
Bodleian Library
1892 establishments in England